"Move Away" is a 1986 song by the British band Culture Club. Taken as the lead single from their fourth album, From Luxury to Heartache, the song became the group's eighth top-ten hit on the UK Singles Chart, peaking at number seven. It reached number twelve on the Billboard Hot 100, the song was popular on US radio and the music video received healthy airplay on MTV during the spring of 1986 and was also their last single to reach the Top 40 in the US. It also reached the top ten in various other countries including Italy (#10) and Australia (#10).

The song was produced by Lew Hahn and Arif Mardin (the latter a producer for Chaka Khan and Aretha Franklin in the 80s). "Move Away" was the only single from the album to reach the top-ten in the UK and would be the band's last UK top 10 hit until 1998's "I Just Wanna Be Loved".

Critical reception
On its release, Eleanor Levy of Record Mirror described "Move Away" as a "very clever, radio-orientated pop tune" with a "sparkling production" and "creditable performance". Jerry Smith of Music Week praised it as a "classic pop tune" on which George "delivers a strong vocal over [the] polished production". He added the song "certainly surpasses anything that appeared on the awful Waking Up with the House on Fire".

In the US, Cash Box praised the "effervescent production and Boy George’s rich, silky voice."  Billboard said it consists of "guileless, breezy hooks."

Music video
The video-clip for the song, which cast Boy George and Jon Moss as silent film-stars racing cars across a black/white movie screen, was filmed at the Brixton Academy, London. George's friend Alice Temple can also be seen in the video.

Track listing

7"
A. Move Away
B. Sexuality (7" version (alternate mix))

12"
Released at least in UK, Argentina, Australia, Spain, USA
A. Move Away (Extended Mix)
B. Sexuality (Tango Dub Remix Version)

5"
Released as a 5" picture disc vinyl with gatefold cardboard picture sleeve
A. Move Away
B. Sexuality

Chart performance

Weekly Charts

Year-end charts

In popular culture
The song was featured in the background of a 1986 episode of the US daytime soap opera General Hospital. In 1986, Boy George sang the song in a guest-starring role in an episode of the television series The A-Team entitled "Cowboy George". The song also featured in the first episode of Casualty.

References

1986 singles
Culture Club songs
1986 songs
Song recordings produced by Arif Mardin
Virgin Records singles
Songs written by Boy George
Songs written by Roy Hay (musician)
Songs written by Mikey Craig
Songs written by Jon Moss
Songs written by Phil Pickett